Setnica may refer to:

Setnica, Poland, a settlement in the West Pomeranian Voivodeship, Poland
Setnica, Medvode, a settlement in the Municipality of Medvode, Slovenia
Setnica, Dobrova–Polhov Gradec, a settlement in the Municipality of Dobrova–Polhov Gradec, Slovenia